Poopó may refer to:

 Poopó Lake, Oruro, Bolivia
 Poopó Province, Oruro, Bolivia
 Poopó Municipality, Oruro, Bolivia
 Poopó Canton, Oruro, Bolivia